Kalman Kiš (born 1 December 1914, date of death unknown) was a Yugoslav wrestler. He competed in the men's Greco-Roman middleweight at the 1936 Summer Olympics.

References

External links
 

1914 births
Year of death missing
Yugoslav male sport wrestlers
Olympic wrestlers of Yugoslavia
Wrestlers at the 1936 Summer Olympics
Place of birth missing